This is a list of episodes for the television series Mr. and Mrs. North.

Series overview
{| class="wikitable plainrowheaders" style="text-align:center"
! colspan=2| Season
! Episodes
! First aired
! Last aired
! Network
|-
| style="width:5px; background:#500050"|
| 1
| 39
| 
| 
| CBS
|-
| bgcolor="B0171F"|
| 2
| 18
| 
| 
| NBC
|-
|}

Episodes

Season 1 (1952–53)

Season 2 (1954)

References

External links
 

Mr. and Mrs. North
Mr. and Mrs. North